Lasiognathus dinema is a species of wolftrap angler found in the deep waters of the northern Gulf of Mexico. It is found at depths of around 3,280 to 4,900 feet (1,000 to 1,500 meter).

This species is part of the Angler Fish species. This species has an illicium that is 15-47mm long. The illicium is surrounded by a posterior extension that helps protect it and has a this translucent posterior escal (umbrella like).

This species get its name due to its escal hooks Greek prefix di- 'two' and nemo- 'thread'.

References

Thaumatichthyidae
Fish described in 2015